The Titleholders Championship was a women's golf tournament played from in 1937 to 1966 and again in 1972. It was later designated a major championship by the LPGA Tour.

History
The Titleholders Championship was founded in 1937. Like the Masters Tournament for men, which began a few years earlier, it was played in Augusta, Georgia, but at Augusta Country Club, not at the adjacent Augusta National Golf Club. The winners of various amateur and professional events were invited to take part, although most of the competitors were amateurs. There were very few women professionals at the time and most earned their living as club or teaching professionals.

The Titleholders itself did not offer prize money until 1948, when a prize fund of $600 was introduced, with half of the money going to the professional placing highest in the event. The tournament was discontinued after November 1966, but was revived for one year in 1972, when it was played in May at the Pine Needles Lodge and Golf Club in Southern Pines, North Carolina. All of these stagings are now recognized as major championships by the LPGA, even though the organization was not founded until 1950.

Winners

(a) - denotes amateur
PO - won in playoff
^ - 54 holes

Multiple winners
This table lists the golfers who have won more than one Titleholders Championship.

Winners by nationality
This table lists the total number of titles won by golfers of each nationality as a major.

References

 
Former LPGA Tour events
Women's golf tournaments in the United States
Golf in Georgia (U.S. state)
Golf in North Carolina
Sports in Augusta, Georgia
Women's major golf championships
Recurring sporting events established in 1937
Recurring events disestablished in 1972
1937 establishments in Georgia (U.S. state)
1972 disestablishments in Georgia (U.S. state)
Women's sports in North Carolina
History of women in Georgia (U.S. state)